Prusice  is a town in Trzebnica County, Lower Silesian Voivodeship, in south-western Poland. It is the seat of the administrative district (gmina) called Gmina Prusice.

As of 2019, the town has a population of 2,243.

Sights
Among the historic sights of Prusice are the Market Square (Rynek), the Renaissance Town Hall (Ratusz) and the churches of St. James and St. Joseph.

Twin towns – sister cities
See twin towns of Gmina Prusice.

References

Cities and towns in Lower Silesian Voivodeship
Trzebnica County